Richardsonian Romanesque is a style of Romanesque Revival architecture named after the American architect Henry Hobson Richardson (1838–1886). The revival style incorporates 11th and 12th century southern French, Spanish, and Italian Romanesque characteristics. Richardson first used elements of the style in his Richardson Olmsted Complex in Buffalo, New York, designed in 1870. Multiple architects followed in this style in the late 19th century; Richardsonian Romanesque later influenced modern styles of architecture as well.

History and development

This very free revival style incorporates 11th and 12th century southern French, Spanish and Italian Romanesque characteristics. It emphasizes clear, strong picturesque massing, round-headed "Romanesque" arches, often springing from clusters of short squat columns, recessed entrances, richly varied rustication, blank stretches of walling contrasting with bands of windows, and cylindrical towers with conical caps embedded in the walling.

Architects working in the style 
The style includes work by the generation of architects practicing in the 1880s before the influence of the Beaux-Arts styles.

Some of the practitioners who most faithfully followed Richardson's proportion, massing and detailing had worked in his office. These include:
Alexander Wadsworth Longfellow and Frank Alden (Longfellow, Alden & Harlow of Boston and Pittsburgh);
George Shepley and Charles Coolidge (Richardson's successor firm Shepley, Rutan & Coolidge of Boston);
Herbert C. Burdett (Marling & Burdett of Buffalo)

Other architects who employed Richardson Romanesque elements in their designs include: 
Spier and Rohns and George D. Mason, both firms from Detroit;
Edward J. Lennox, Toronto-based architect;
John Wellborn Root, in Chicago.
Harvey Ellis, in Minneapolis, Minnesota.
Theodore Link, in St. Louis, Missouri and surrounding area.

The style also influenced the Chicago school of architecture and architects Louis Sullivan and Frank Lloyd Wright.

Overseas, Folke Zettervall was influenced by the Richardson style when he designed several railway stations in Sweden during this period.  In Finland, Eliel Saarinen was influenced by Richardson.

Dispersion

Research is underway to try to document the westward movement of the artisans and craftsmen, many of whom were immigrant Italians and Irish, who built in the Richardsonian Romanesque tradition. The style began in the East, in and around Boston, where Richardson built the influential Trinity Church on Copley Square. As the style was losing favor in the East, it was gaining popularity further west. Stone carvers and masons trained in the Richardsonian manner appear to have taken the style west, until it died out in the early decades of the 20th century.

As an example, four small bank buildings were built in Richardsonian Romanesque style in Osage County, Oklahoma, during 1904–1911: the Osage Bank of Fairfax, Bank of Hominy, Bank of Burbank, and Bank of Bigheart.

See also
H. H. Richardson Historic District of North Easton

References
Notes

Bibliography
Kelsey, Mavis P. and Donald H. Dyal, The Courthouses of Texas: A Guide, Texas A&M University Press, College Station Texas 1993 
Kvaran, Einar Einarsson, Architectural Sculpture in America unpublished manuscript
Kvaran, Einar Einarsson, Starkweather Memorial Chapel, Highland Cemetery, Ypsilanti, Michigan, Unpublished paper 1983
Larson, Paul C., Editor, with Susan Brown, The Spirit of H. H. Richardson on the Midwest Prairies, University Art Museum, University of Minnesota, Minneapolis and Iowa State University Press, Ames 1988
Ochsner, Jeffrey Karl, H. H. Richardson: Complete Architectural Works, MIT Press, Cambridge MA 1984 
Ochsner, Jeffrey Karl, and Andersen, Dennis Alan, Distant Corner: Seattle Architects and the Legacy of H. H. Richardson, University of Washington Press, Seattle WA 2003 
Van Rensselaer, Mariana Griswold, Henry Hobson Richardson and His Works, Dover Publications, Inc. NY 1959 (Reprint of 1888 edition)

External links

 

Architectural styles
Revival architectural styles
American architectural styles
Victorian architectural styles
House styles
19th-century architectural styles